Kyle Jones (born October 4, 1986) is a former Canadian football linebacker. He was signed by the Toronto Argonauts as an undrafted free agent in 2009. He played CIS football for the Bishop's Gaiters after playing for the Woodlands Rams. On June 20, 2010, Jones was released by the Argonauts. He rejoined the Argonauts on August 9, 2010 when they signed him to a practice roster deal, but was released by them again on August 31, 2010. After spending the 2011 training camp with the Montreal Alouettes, Jones was signed by the Hamilton Tiger-Cats on June 27, 2011. He was later released by the Tiger-Cats on May 17, 2012 and immediately signed by the Toronto Argonauts.

References

External links
Saskatchewan Roughriders bio
Winnipeg Blue Bombers bio
BC Lions bio

1986 births
Living people
BC Lions players
Bishop's Gaiters football players
Canadian football linebackers
Hamilton Tiger-Cats players
Toronto Argonauts players
Montreal Alouettes players
Players of Canadian football from Ontario
Saskatchewan Roughriders players
Sportspeople from Mississauga
Winnipeg Blue Bombers players